Downward stroke or downstroke can mean:
 In handwriting, a downward stroke or downstroke is a ballistic stroke having a direction toward the feet and/or torso of the person
 In guitar terminology, a downward stroke or downstroke (better known as downpicking) is a stroke moved in a downward motion, relative to the position of the instrument, against one or more of the strings to make them vibrate